Dugald McInnes (2 June 1877 – 11 September 1929) was a Canadian sport shooter who competed in the 1908 Summer Olympics.

In the 1908 Olympics, he won a bronze medal in the team military rifle event and was 16th in 1000 yard free rifle event.

References

External links
Dugald McInnes' profile at databaseOlympics
Dugald McInnes' obituary

1877 births
1929 deaths
Canadian male sport shooters
ISSF rifle shooters
Olympic shooters of Canada
Shooters at the 1908 Summer Olympics
Olympic bronze medalists for Canada
Olympic medalists in shooting
Medalists at the 1908 Summer Olympics
20th-century Canadian people
British emigrants to Canada